Aranayaka is a town in the Kegalle District of Sabaragamuwa Province in Sri Lanka. Its agricultural economy revolves around local rubber, tea, banana and mahogany plantations.

The Mawanella-Aranayaka-Horawella Road (Highway B278) passes through the middle of the city, running parallel to the Maha Oya on the east side.

See also
 2016 Aranayake landslide
 Aranayaka Divisional Secretariat

References
 Statistical Information for Aranayaka Divisional Secretariat

Populated places in Sabaragamuwa Province
Populated places in Kegalle District